THO complex subunit 1 is a protein that in humans is encoded by the THOC1 gene.

HPR1 is part of the TREX (transcription/export) complex, which includes TEX1 (MIM 606929), THO2 (MIM 300395), ALY (MIM 604171), and UAP56 (MIM 606390).[supplied by OMIM]

Interactions
THOC1 has been shown to interact with Retinoblastoma protein.

References

Further reading